A rate card is a document that lists the costs and details for the different advertisement placement alternatives offered by a service provider, like a media outlet.

This is typically the most one can spend, similar to the rack rate at a hotel. The majority of advertising customers will shell out much less than this because to volume discounts, a desire to unload extra space, or other considerations.

See also
 Advertising management
 Yield management
 Price discrimination

There are many websites and companies which sell rate cards or advertise them. This is because they have already done the research to see which rate works the best in the media and on television. Advertisers and companies looking to make a profit turn to the rate card to see how much they will need to be spending to get their message across to consumers. 

A rate card is a document provided by a newspaper or other print publication featuring the organization's rate for advertising. It may also detail any deadlines, demographics, policies, additional fees and artwork requirements. The smaller the publication, the less information that may be available in the rate card.

Some larger newspapers may have a rate card for a particular kind of advertisement. They may have their rates broken down by classified ads, retail advertising and even national ad rates.

Rate cards help the retailer understand what types of ad sizes, discounts and other advertising the publication has to offer. When choosing a newspaper or print media, you can use rate cards to compare ad rates based on circulation before you buy advertising space.

Before placing an ad, be sure you understand the terms and conditions of advertising with the publication. In many cases where there may be a conflict between the insertion order and the rate card, the rate card will be the deciding factor. This does not mean the prices on the rate card are fixed. Most retailers will find the paper's sales rep will offer special rates for first time advertisers or other discounts.

If you're interested in advertising within a particular publication, check their website or call the office and ask for a copy of their current rate card. Many newspapers and magazines have their rate cards available online in a PDF format.

References

See also

List price

Advertising
Pricing